Kilbride (Gaelic: Cill Bhride) is a townland within the parish of Tramore in  County Waterford, Ireland. It is split into two sections: Kilbride North and Kilbride South.

Kilbride got its name from an old church in Kilbride South (.) that was named after St Brigid, possibly Brigit of Kildare, daughter of Dubhtach, whose feast day was 1 February, but associated with her contemporary St Briga, daughter of Congall, whose feast day is 21 January and who is also associated with Oughter Ard Ardclough Straffan County Kildare, and Brideschurch near Sallins (.). Neighbouring townlands include Monmahouge, Cullencastle, Butlerstown, Knockeen, and Carriglong.

Attractions include an annual Halloween bonfire, the Dolmen located in Knockeen, and the fairy rings in Carriglong.

References 

Townlands of County Waterford